Tony (Antoine) Krier (1906–1994) was a Luxembourg photographer who worked as a photojournalist for the Luxemburger Wort, a daily newspaper. He was also court photographer for the Grand Ducal Family of Luxembourg. He is remembered for his touristic photographs of the Luxembourg City and of the country as a whole.

His publications include: Le Souverain et son peuple (1965), Les Châteaux historiques du Luxembourg (1975) and La Vie d'une grande dame (1986).

Works
Schueberfouer. Children on carousel. 1939
Fête de la jeunesse. 1958
Coopérative de Bonnevoie. 1959
Limpertsberg. 1941
Eleanor Roosevelt et Perle Mesta au Findel. 1950
Crèche au plateau Altmünster. 1968
Prime Minister Churchill accompanied by Prince Félix, leaving the pavillon of the Grand Duke of Luxembourg at the station of Luxembourg city, dated July 15, 1946
 Viscount Montgomery of Alamein, November 1948, at the "caserne du St. Esprit".
Robert Schuman, Konrad Adenauer, Joseph Bech. August 10, 1952.

References

Luxembourgian photographers
1906 births
1994 deaths
Photojournalists